John Everett (born 22 March 1957) is a former American rugby union player. Everett played at the inaugural 1987 Rugby World Cup. He debuted for the Eagles against  in Chicago on June 9, 1984. He made his last appearance for  against  at the 1987 World Cup in New Zealand.

Everett is the forwards coach for Saint Mary's Gaels men’s rugby team.

References

External links
ESPN Scrum Profile

1957 births
Living people
American rugby union players
United States international rugby union players
Rugby union hookers